Chela may refer to:
 Chela (fish), a genus of small minnow-type fish in the Cyprinid family
 Chela (organ), a pincer-like organ terminating certain limbs of some arthropods such as crabs
 Chela (meteorite), a meteorite fall of 1988 in Tanzania
 Chela, Ethiopia, a town in southern Ethiopia
 Chela (singer), an Australian electropop artist on the Kitsuné label
 Juan Ignacio Chela (born 1979), a professional tennis player from Argentina
 Julian Chela-Flores, Venezuelan astrobiologist and physicist.

See also
 Chila (disambiguation)
 Quetzaltenango or Xela, a town in Guatemala
 Serra da Chela, a mountain range in Angola